Little Big Horn (also released as Natural Soul) is an album by jazz cornetist Nat Adderley released on the Riverside label featuring performances by Adderley with Junior Mance, Kenny Burrell/Jim Hall Bob Cranshaw, and Mickey Roker.

Reception
The Allmusic review by Scott Yanow states "A fine obscurity recorded at a time when Nat was one of the stars of his brother Cannonball Adderley's Sextet". The Penguin Guide to Jazz awarded the album 4 stars stating "it's hard to understand why such a quiet gem has slipped through the net".

Track listing
All compositions by Nat Adderley except as indicated
 "El Chico" - 6:42  
 "Foo Foo" - 4:11  
 "Loneliness" - 4:14  
 "Little Big Horn" - 5:20  
 "Half-Time" - 4:48  
 "Broadway Lady" - 4:19  
 "Roses for Your Pillow" - 5:11  
 "Hustle With Russell" - 4:20 
Recorded in New York City on September 23, 1963 (tracks 2-4 & 8) and October 4, 1963 (tracks 1 & 5-7)

Personnel
Nat Adderley – cornet 
Junior Mance - piano
Jim Hall (tracks 1 & 5-7), Kenny Burrell (tracks 2-4 & 8) - guitar
Bob Cranshaw - bass
Mickey Roker - drums

References

1963 albums
Riverside Records albums
Nat Adderley albums